Atikhisar Dam is a dam in Çanakkale Province, Turkey, built between 1964 and 1966.

See also
List of dams and reservoirs in Turkey

External links
DSI

Dams in Çanakkale Province
Dams completed in 1966